Donald Long may refer to:
 Donald Russell Long, United States Army soldier and Medal of Honor recipient
 Donald S. Long, Louisiana State University sports blogger
 Don Long, American baseball coach